This is a summary of every season that Queen of the South have competed in Scottish and European football since the club first entered the Scottish Football League in 1923–24. The Doonhamers were involved in regional football between their formation in March 1919 and entering the Scottish Football League in August 1923. The list below details the club's achievements in all major competitions and also their all-time league record.

Statistics
Last updated 18 March 2023

Key

P = Played
W = Games won
D = Games drawn
L = Games lost
F = Goals for
A = Goals against
Pts = Points
Pos = Final position

1 = Division One (1st tier)
2 = Division Two (2nd tier)
3 = Division Three (3rd tier)
A = Division A (1st tier)
B = Division B (2nd tier)
First = First Division (2nd tier)
Second = Second Division (3rd tier)
Championship = Scottish Championship (2nd tier)
UC = UEFA Europa League
QR2 = Qualifying Round 2

DNE = Did Not Enter
DNQ = Did Not Qualify
R1 = Round 1
R2 = Round 2
R3 = Round 3
R4 = Round 4
R5 = Round 5
Group = Group Stages
Quarter = Quarter-finals
Semi = Semi-finals
Finalists = Runners-Up

Colour coding

Notes and references

External links
 Scottish Cup Archive
 League Cup Archive
 Scotland – List of Topscorers
 QOSFC All Time Records

Seasons
 
Queen of the South